Elizabeth  Ann Elliott (March 19, 1918 – July 7, 2001) pioneered the expansion of the role of women in petroleum geology. She was an active member of the American Association of Petroleum Geologists (AAPG) for 56 years.

Early life and background 

Elizabeth Anne Elliott also known as Betty or "Aunt Betty" was born March 19, 1918) near New Cordell, Oklahoma. Her father, Bruce W. Baker, was the only physician in Cordell, therefore as a young girl Elizabeth would accompany her father on his numerous travels to visit patients in their community. In high school, Elliott had the highest academic achievements of her class and became the valedictorian. In 1940 she pursued a post-secondary education from the University of Oklahoma, and from a class of 40, she was one of 3 women who graduated with a B.S in geology. Betty had initially enrolled in pre-med but switched her major to geology because she was inspired by Charles Decker, one of the founders of the "American Association of Petroleum Geologists" (AAPG).

Throughout her career she was an active member of the “American Association of Petroleum Geologists” (AAPG). Continuing her studies, she attended University of Colorado, where she held a teaching fellowship, and research program focusing on micropaleontology and the relationship and correlation of cretaceous shales. Elliott's work with cretaceous shales helped foster a better understanding of the Cretaceous Interior Seaway. Elliott also developed a micropaleontology library during her time at the University of Colorado. However, due to the Second World War she was unable to finish her master's degree. She married Guy Elliott and the couple moved to Seattle, Washington where she took a job as a civil engineer at the Corps of Engineers. At that time she also worked as a stratigrapher for the U.S. Geological Services in Denver, Colorado. Afterwards, Elliott worked in Midland, Texas for Gulf Oil. During her time working for Gulf Oil, Elliott worked at a well-site, a job that was very rare for a woman to hold in the 1940s. Later, she worked for the company Mobil Oil in both New York and in Dallas, Texas. After her husband's death in 1960, Elliott moved to Mobil's Oklahoma city office where she worked on the stratigraphy of the Permian and the Arkoma basin. While in Dallas, Elliott evaluated offshore Atlantic basins and Central American concession where she trained many young geologists. Nicknamed “Aunt Betty” by her trainees, she retired around the age of 67, opening up a consulting office in Dallas. Betty Ann Elliott was said to have "...excelled at sample identification and "sat" wells, a very uncommon task for a woman." Elliott served as the 2nd VP for the Dallas Geological Society from 1985-1986. At age 81 Elliott received the Pioneer Award at the AAPG Annual Convention, marking the first time the award had ever been given to a woman. On July, 2001, at age 83, she died.

References

Further reading
 Gries, Robbie  "Women Sitting Wells:A Forgotten History", September 21, 2015. Retrieved on Dec 6, 2017

1918 births
2001 deaths
American women geologists
University of Oklahoma alumni
University of Colorado fellows
20th-century American women
20th-century American people